Cheers of the Crowd is a 1935 American drama film directed by Vin Moore and starring Russell Hopton, Irene Ware and Harry Holman.

Cast
 Russell Hopton as Lee Adams  
 Irene Ware as Mary Larkin  
 Harry Holman as Honest John Brady  
 Bradley Page as Blake Walton  
 John Quillan as Eddie  
 Wade Boteler as Dan O'Reilly  
 John Dilson as Barney Booth 
 Roberta Gale as Betty O'Reilly  
 Betty Blythe as Lil Langdon Walton

References

Bibliography
 Monaco, James. The Encyclopedia of Film. Perigee Books, 1991.

External links
 

1935 films
1935 drama films
American drama films
Monogram Pictures films
Films directed by Vin Moore
American black-and-white films
1930s English-language films
1930s American films